Luděk Pachman (German: Ludek Pachmann, May 11, 1924 – March 6, 2003) was a Czechoslovak-German chess grandmaster, chess writer, and political activist. In 1972, after being imprisoned and tortured almost to death by the Communist regime in Czechoslovakia, he was allowed to emigrate to West Germany. He lived the remainder of his life there, and resumed his chess career with considerable success, including playing in the Interzonal in 1976 and winning the West German Championship in 1978.

Career
Pachman's first chess championship came in 1940, when he became champion of the nearby village of Cista (population 900). The first break in his chess career came in 1943, when he was invited to an international tournament in Prague. World Champion Alexander Alekhine dominated the event, with Paul Keres taking second place. Pachman finished ninth in the nineteen-player tournament. Alekhine paid him a compliment in an article in the Frankfurter Zeitung and from the fifth round on, invited him every evening to analyze games and opening variations. Pachman wrote: "I don't have to tell you how a beginner from a village chess club felt at that time."

Pachman went on to become one of the world's leading players. He was awarded the International Master title in 1950 and the Grandmaster title in 1954.  He won fifteen international tournaments, but considered sharing second place in Havana 1963, with Mikhail Tal and Efim Geller, behind Viktor Korchnoi, his best tournament result. Pachman won the Czechoslovak championship seven times between 1946 and 1966. He became the champion of West Germany in 1978. He played in six Interzonal tournaments between Saltsjöbaden 1948 and Manila 1976. He represented Czechoslovakia in eight consecutive Chess Olympiads from 1952 through 1966, usually playing .

The most successful year of his career was 1959. After winning the Czechoslovakian championship he went on a South American tour, winning tournaments in Mar del Plata (tied with Miguel Najdorf); Santiago, Chile (tied with Borislav Ivkov); and Lima, Peru (again tied with Ivkov). On this tour he beat the 16-year-old Bobby Fischer twice. Pachman made an even lifetime score against Fischer, +2−2=4.

Politics
Pachman was politically active throughout his life, first as a Communist and later as a staunch anti-Communist. In December 1968, he won a tournament in Athens. Upon his return to Prague, the authorities arrested, imprisoned, and tortured him for months. During this time he attempted suicide: On Christmas Eve 1969, doctors called his wife and told her that he probably would not survive the night. In 1972, Pachman was finally allowed to emigrate to West Germany. He soon became known as a strongly anti-Communist political activist, and his eloquence made him a regular guest on political talk shows.

Author
Pachman was also a prolific author, publishing eighty books in five languages. In the 1950s, he became the world's leading opening expert with the publication of his four-volume opus, Theory of Modern Chess. Pachman considered Modern Chess Strategy, published in 1959, to be his best book. His book Checkmate in Prague recounts his treatment at the hands of the Communist authorities.

Notable games

Ludek Pachman vs. Oleg Neikirch, Portoroz 1958, Queen's Gambit Declined, Semi-Tarrasch (D41), . Pachman attacks his opponent's castled king, offering the sacrifice of both bishops. His opponent declines the second bishop, and could have continued the game with 25...Qh7, but it is not easy to find such moves  in the limited time. Pachman was a good practical player and knew well where it pays to take a risk in the game.

Books

References

External links
Grandmaster Ludek Pachman dies at 78

Edward Winter, Pachman, Bohatirchuk and Politics (2003)
Visa with photo 1959
Visa with photo 1962

1924 births
2003 deaths
People from Bělá pod Bezdězem
Chess grandmasters
Chess Olympiad competitors
Czech chess players
Czech male writers
German chess players
German chess writers
Chess theoreticians
Czech anti-communists
Czechoslovak emigrants to Germany
German male non-fiction writers
20th-century chess players